Buccinaria jonkeri is a species of sea snail, a marine gastropod mollusk in the family Raphitomidae.

Description
The size of the white shell varies between 20mm and 35mm.

Distribution
This marine species occurs off the Philippines.

References

 Koperberg, Ella Julie. Jungtertiäre und quartäre Mollusken von Timor. No. 17. Algemeene Landsdrukkerij, 1931.
 Bouchet P. & Sysoev A. (1997) Revision of the Recent species of Buccinaria (Gastropoda: Conoidea), a genus of deep-water turrids of Tethyan origin. Venus, Japanese Journal of Malacology, 56:93-119

External links
 
 MNHN, Paris: specimen

jonkeri
Gastropods described in 1931